A total of 79 association football clubs in Belgium have yet played in the Belgian First Division since its creation in 1895. Those clubs are listed here alphabetically. The last spell in the first division is indicated in brackets. Teams in bold are teams playing in the 2022-23 season. Teams in italics stopped, went into liquidation or merged with or into another team.

References

Clubs
Association football in Belgium lists